Vueltas Hill Biological Reserve, is a protected area in Costa Rica, managed under the Central Conservation Area, it was created in 1994 by decree 23260-MIRENEM.

Ramsar site  
Part of the  Ramsar site is located within this protected area and shared with Chirripó National Park, Tapantí National Park, Los Santos Forest Reserve and Macho River Forest Reserve.

References 

Nature reserves in Costa Rica
Protected areas established in 1994
1994 establishments in Costa Rica
Ramsar sites in Costa Rica